Lalganj is a town with nagar panchayat in Raebareli district of Uttar Pradesh, India. It is located on the road from Raebareli to Fatehpur, with other roads leading to Dalmau, Unnao, and Baksar.
 It is developing rapidly due to the Rail Coach Factory and also has the largest railway station in the district.

Lalganj is located between Unnao and Raebareli and hence it's also called as Baiswara Lalganj. The language spoken here is Baiswari. The postal code of Lalganj is 229206 and STD code of Lalganj is 05315.

As of 2011, Lalganj has a population of 23,124, in 3,996 households.

History
Lalganj was founded by, and named after, Lal Singh of Simarpaha.

At the turn of the 20th century, Lalganj was described as "a flourishing little market town" that served as the second-most-important bazar in the district, behind Raebareli itself. It hosted markets twice a week and traded hides, cloth, and oilseeds with Kanpur. Because of the town's growing importance, the road between it and Raebareli was metalled in 1902 through 1904. At around that time, Lalganj had a police station, a post office, a cattle pound, and a large primary school, as well as a road inspection bungalow that had recently been built. The town had a large Bania population as well as a Bais colony. Lalganj was then technically part of the village of Datauli Lalganj; Datauli had been founded by Sheo Singh, an ancestor of Lal Singh.

Demographics

According to the 2011 census, Lalganj has a population of 23,124 people, in 3,996 households. The town's sex ratio is 914 females to every 1000 males, which is the lowest among towns in Raebareli district;  12,082 of Lalganj's residents are male (52.2%) and 11,042 are female (47.8%). The 0-6 age group makes up about 10.3% of the town's population; the sex ratio for this group is 857, which is also the lowest in the district. Members of Scheduled Castes make up 14.78% of the town's population, while members of Scheduled Tribes make up 0.12%. Lalganj's literacy rate was 86.07% (counting only people age 7 and up), which was the highest among towns in the district; literacy was higher among men and boys (91.2%) than among women and girls (80.5%). The scheduled castes literacy rate is 75.52% (84.15% among men and boys, and 65.74% among women and girls).

In terms of employment, 23.09% of Lalganj residents were classified as main workers (i.e. people employed for at least 6 months per year) in 2011. Marginal workers (i.e. people employed for less than 6 months per year) made up 5.81%, and the remaining 71.10% were non-workers. Employment status varied significantly according to gender, with 47.08% of men being either main or marginal workers, compared to 9.01% of women.

55.63% of Lalganj residents live in slum conditions as of 2011. There are 10 slum areas in Lalganj: Adarsh Nagar, Chaman Ganj, Chikvahi, Domahi, Mahesh Kheda, Pure Baba, Ali Nagar, Krishna Nagar, Sudan Kheda, and Pure Debi. These range in size from about 101 to 455 households and have between 8 and 13 tap water access points. The number of flush toilets installed in people's homes ranges from 91 to 338. All 10 areas are serviced by a mix of open and closed sewers.

After 2012 there is a huge hike in population because of the establishment of the Modern Coach Factory.

City
Famous places are Tejgaon Complex located at main road and Hanuman temple that is located at Behta Chauraha (square). There is a post graduate college which offers various courses. The small distance from Rae Bareli allows students to study there. 
 
The major areas in Main Lalganj are: New Market, Main road, Ghosiyana, Sabji Mandi, Sarafa Mandi, Ambedkar Marg,  Saket Nagar, Shanti nagar, Acharya Nagar, Gandhi Chauraha, Sarvoday Nagar, Lalrajendra Nagar, Nirala Nagar, Harsh Nagar, Yashpal Kapoor Marg, Mahesh Nagar, Tulsi chauraha, Chick Mandi, Tikona Park, Sarvodaya Nagar.

Firefighting service is located at the village of Shekhwapur, 2 km away.

Rail Coach Factory

This factory was established by the Central Government in the Lalganj and was inaugurated on 7 November 2012 by Congress President Sonia Gandhi. This was third Coach manufacturing unit of India. It is located on the Raebareli Road, about four kilometers out of Lalganj. This factory produces AC coaches. Rail Coach Factory, Raebareli is now Modern Coach Factory, Raebareli. Modern Coach Factory manufacture LWACCW, LWACCN, LWSCN, LGS and LWRRM type of coaches. This is the first coach factory in India which manufactures only LHB type coaches.

Villages
Lalganj CD block has the following 92 villages:

See also
Barbasa Gaharwar

References
.

Cities and towns in Raebareli district